Deyon Sizer (born August 16, 1996) is an American football defensive end for the New Jersey Generals of the United States Football League (USFL). He played college football at CSU Pueblo.

Professional career

Denver Broncos
Sizer signed with the Denver Broncos as an undrafted free agent on May 13, 2019. He was waived on July 26, 2019, but was re-signed on August 4. He was waived on August 31, 2019 and re-signed to the practice squad. He was promoted to the active roster on December 14, 2019.

On April 27, 2020, Sizer was waived by the Broncos. He was re-signed to their practice squad on September 24, 2020. He signed a reserve/future contract on January 4, 2021.

On August 17, 2021, Sizer was waived by the Broncos. He was re-signed to the practice squad on December 28. He was released on January 3, 2022.

New Jersey Generals
Sizer signed with the New Jersey Generals of the United States Football League on April 1, 2022. He was transferred to the team's inactive roster on April 30 due to a chest injury. He was moved back to the active roster on May 6.

References

External links
CSU–Pueblo ThunderWolves bio

1996 births
Living people
American football defensive ends
CSU Pueblo ThunderWolves football players
Denver Broncos players
Sportspeople from Aurora, Colorado
Players of American football from Colorado
New Jersey Generals (2022) players